The name Ofel has been used for four tropical cyclones in the Philippines by PAGASA in the Western Pacific Ocean.

 Tropical Storm Haima (2004) (T0420, 24W, Ofel)
 Typhoon Jangmi (2008) (T0815, 19W, Ofel) – struck Taiwan and approached Japan
 Typhoon Son-Tinh (2012) (T1223, 24W, Ofel)
 Tropical Depression Ofel (2020)

Pacific typhoon set index articles